Nuno Sérgio dos Santos Dias (born 28 December 1972) is a Portuguese Futsal coach who currently manages Sporting Clube de Portugal.

Honours

Manager
 Sporting CP 
 UEFA Futsal Champions League: 2
 Portuguese Futsal League: 7
 Portuguese Futsal Cup: 5
 Portuguese Futsal League Cup: 4
 Portuguese Futsal Super Cup: 6

References

1972 births
Living people
Portuguese men's futsal players
Futsal coaches
People from Cantanhede, Portugal
Instituto D. João V players
Sportspeople from Coimbra District